Lockport is a station on Metra's Heritage Corridor in Lockport, Illinois. In Metra's zone-based fare system, Lockport is in zone G. As of 2018, Lockport is the 136th busiest of Metra's 236 non-downtown stations, with an average of 344 weekday boardings. As of 2022, Lockport is served by three inbound trains in the morning and three outbound trains in the evening on weekdays only.

Lockport Station was originally built in 1863 by the Chicago and Alton Railroad. The tracks run parallel to the Illinois and Michigan Canal, and shares the right-of-way with Amtrak's Lincoln Service and Texas Eagle trains, however, no Amtrak trains stop here.

Three blocks east of the station is the meeting place of the Blackhawk Chapter of the National Railroad Historical Society at the Gladys Fox Museum.

Bus connections
Pace
 834 Joliet/Downers Grove

References

External links 

Station from 13th Street from Google Maps Street View

Metra stations in Illinois
Lockport, Illinois
Former Chicago and Alton Railroad stations
Railway stations in the United States opened in 1863
Railway stations in Will County, Illinois